Joe Blystone is an American farmer and political candidate from the U.S. state of Ohio. He founded the Blystone Farm, which is located in Canal Winchester, Ohio, in 2004. A member of the Republican Party, he ran for governor of Ohio in 2022, ultimately finishing third statewide in the Republican primary, behind Mike DeWine and Jim Renacci.

Blystone was born in East Liverpool, Ohio. In 1987, he graduated from Pickerington High School (which has since split into Pickerington High School Central and Pickerington High School North) in Pickerington, Ohio. He worked in construction before establishing his own farm in 2004. In March 2022, he told the Columbus Dispatch that though he was running for governor of Ohio, his "heart is being a farmer".

Election History

Campaign finance issues
Blystone's campaign has been accused by Ohio Secretary of State Frank LaRose of violating state campaign finance laws based on its expense reports. In March 2022, LaRose said that some of the donations made to his campaign may have been unlawful, e.g. cash donations exceeding $100 each and donations from corporations, and that they may need to be refunded. Blystone's campaign manager, Bryan Robson, argued that the problems identified in the campaign's books were "clerical errors or omissions of required information" and that the campaign was "in the process of rectifying these errors and omissions". In September 2022, LaRose sent a letter to Blystone's campaign alleging that the campaign's violations of campaign finance laws were so egregious that Blystone should be criminally prosecuted. LaRose's office also outlined a set of conditions that Blystone would have to meet in order to prevent LaRose from recommending that the Ohio Elections Commission pursue criminal charges against him. The Commission will decide whether to bring charges against Blystone at a hearing scheduled for December 8, 2022. Blystone responded by referring to the letter as "obvious political bias"; his campaign also offered to pay $20,000 to resolve the matter, an offer that LaRose's office rejected as "wholly insufficient". 

In early January 2023, Blystone would come to a deal with the Ohio Elections Commission. Blystone admitted to improperly documenting cash contributions and in-return would have to Pay $105,000 fine, put $75,000 in escrow in Delaware County, terminate his state campaign committee, and not run for elected office for the next five years. The agreement also settles a complaint filed by former Blystone campaign worker, Sarah Chambers. Chambers filed a complaint in October 2021, but Blystone filed a lawsuit to block it. Chamber's lawyer, Scott Pullins, negotiated a deal with Blystone, hoping for a harsher outcome such as potential criminal prosecution. "But, I don't think a majority of the commission was ready to take that step...So, we went in and negotiated pretty much the best deal we could obtain."

References

External links
Campaign website

Living people
Farmers from Ohio
Ohio Republicans
People from East Liverpool, Ohio
Year of birth missing (living people)